Ciego de Ávila is one of the provinces of Cuba, and was previously part of Camagüey Province.  Its capital is Ciego de Ávila, which lies on the Carretera Central (central highway), and the second city is Morón, further north.

The province was separated from Camagüey Province in 1975 by the government.

Geography
Off the north coast of the province, some (cays) of the Jardines del Rey archipelago are being developed as tourist resorts, principally Cayo Coco and Cayo Guillermo. The south coast is characterised by mangroves.

Between Morón and the north coast are several lakes, including the Laguna de Leche (the Lagoon of Milk, so called for its white appearance because of large lime deposits underwater) which is the largest natural lake in Cuba.

Economy
Central Ciego de Ávila is used for cattle ranching, elsewhere in the province sugar, pineapples and citrus fruit are grown. Pineapples are the staple crop, but sweet potatoes, potatoes, yuca, plantains, and bananas are also cultivated for national consumption.

Municipalities 

Source: Population from 2004 Census. Area from 1976 municipal re-distribution.

Demographics
In 2004, the province of Ciego de Ávila had a population of 416,370.

References

External links

Ciego de Ávila

 
Provinces of Cuba
States and territories established in 1975